Baur au Lac is a luxury hotel at Talstrasse, Zürich, Switzerland.

The hotel was founded in 1844 by Johannes Baur, and is still owned by the Baur family. It was completely renovated between 2008 and 2010. It is a member of the Leading Hotels of the World marketing organisation.

References

External links

 

Hotels in Zürich
The Leading Hotels of the World
1844 establishments
Hotels established in the 1840s